Curtis Palidwor (born January 16, 1973 in New Westminster, British Columbia) is a former goaltender for the Calgary Roughnecks in the National Lacrosse League. In 2004 he was named MVP (Most Valuable Player) of the NLL's Champions Cup game, backstopping the Roughnecks to a 14–11 victory over the Buffalo Bandits.

Palidwor was awarded "Player of the Month" honors in March of the 2008 NLL season.

During the 2009 season, Palidwor was traded from the Colorado Mammoth to the Toronto Rock for a second round pick in the 2010 entry draft. In his first and only game as a member of the Rock, he made 16 saves and allowed 10 goals in 45 minutes as the Rock lost 18–10 to Rochester. A week later, the trade was reversed as Palidwor was traded back to the Mammoth for the same draft pick.

Statistics

NLL
Reference:

Awards

References

1973 births
Calgary Roughnecks players
Canadian lacrosse players
Colorado Mammoth players
Edmonton Rush players
Living people
New York Titans (lacrosse) players
Sportspeople from New Westminster
Toronto Rock players